Zulmarys Sánchez (born April 24, 1987 in El Tocuyo) is a Venezuelan sprint canoer who competed in the late 2000s. At the 2008 Summer Olympics in Beijing, she was eliminated in the semifinals of the K-1 500 m event.

References
 Sports-Reference.com profile

1987 births
People from Lara (state)
Canoeists at the 2007 Pan American Games
Canoeists at the 2008 Summer Olympics
Canoeists at the 2011 Pan American Games
Living people
Olympic canoeists of Venezuela
Venezuelan female canoeists
Pan American Games medalists in canoeing
Pan American Games silver medalists for Venezuela
Medalists at the 2007 Pan American Games
20th-century Venezuelan people
21st-century Venezuelan people